The Gainesville Park and Bandstand is a historic park and bandstand in Gainesville, Sumter County, Alabama.  The bandstand is a Greek Revival-style pavilion, built circa 1850.  It is a rare Alabama example of an enduring mid-19th century park structure.  The entire park is surrounded by 19th century wrought iron fence.  The park and bandstand were listed on the National Register of Historic Places on October 29, 1985.

References

National Register of Historic Places in Sumter County, Alabama
Parks in Alabama
Park buildings and structures on the National Register of Historic Places in Alabama
Parks on the National Register of Historic Places in Alabama